Christian Camargo (né Minnick; born July 7, 1971) is an American actor, producer, writer, and director. He is perhaps best known for his roles as Brian Moser in the Showtime drama Dexter, Michael Corrigan in the Netflix drama House of Cards and Eleazar in The Twilight Saga: Breaking Dawn – Parts 1 and 2.

Early years
Camargo was born Christian Minnick in New York City, the son of actress Victoria Wyndham and Wendell Minnick.

He is the grandson of actor Ralph Camargo. He is a 1992 graduate of Hobart College. He was the program director of WEOS, the college's public radio station.

Camargo is a graduate of the Juilliard School, where he was a member of the Drama Division's Group 25 (1992–96). He went on to perform in the 1996 Broadway production of David Hare's Skylight with Michael Gambon (Theater World Award). From there, Camargo went to England to join the inaugural company of Shakespeare's Globe Theatre on the Southbank, where he met his future wife, English actress Juliet Rylance.

Name change
Camargo's grandfather, Ralph Camargo, was a Mexican-American actor who talked his daughters into changing their names to something Anglicized because he felt he had lost roles due to being Latino. Camargo decided to change his name from his father's family name of Minnick to his maternal grandfather's surname of Camargo because of pride in his Mexican-American heritage and a desire to bring back a name that he felt was connected to his profession.

Career
In 2006, Camargo played Brian Moser, a.k.a. Rudy Cooper, in Season 1 of Dexter.

Camargo's New York theater work includes the Public Theater's Kit Marlowe, Steve Martin's Underpants at Classic Stage Company, and the title role of Theater For A New Audience's Coriolanus. In 2008, Camargo played opposite Dianne Wiest, John Lithgow and Katie Holmes in Arthur Miller's All My Sons on Broadway. In early 2009, he played the title role in the Theatre for a New Audience's production of Hamlet. He won an Obie and Drama League nomination for his performance. The show ran until April 12, 2009.

Camargo portrayed Orlando in The Bridge Project's presentation of Shakespeare's As You Like It in Brooklyn, New York. In February 2010, he played Ariel in the company's rendition of Shakespeare's The Tempest. Both plays were directed by British director Sam Mendes. On September 30, 2010, he was cast as Eleazar in The Twilight Saga: Breaking Dawn, Parts 1 and 2.

Camargo wrote and directed Days and Nights, a modern retelling of Anton Chekhov's The Seagull, produced by his wife, actress Juliet Rylance, together with Barbara Romer, founder of the New Globe Theater. The film was scheduled for a 2014 release. He portrayed Mercutio in the 2013 Broadway revival of Romeo and Juliet, directed by David Leveaux and starring Orlando Bloom as Romeo and Condola Rashād as Juliet. He guest starred as Wade Crocker on the third season of Syfy's Haven.

Camargo portrayed the title character of the Theatre for a New Audience off-Broadway production of Pericles, directed by Trevor Nunn, from February to April 2016. In May of that year he guest starred as Dracula on the third season of Showtime's Penny Dreadful.

In March and April 2017, Camargo portrayed a mid-career Robert Evans in Simon McBurney's stage adaptation of The Kid Stays in the Picture, staged in London's Royal Court Theatre.

He also appeared as Tamacti Jun in the American TV show See in November 2019.

Personal life
In November 2008, Camargo married British actress Juliet Rylance. He has a son born in November 2019

Filmography

 The Guiding Light (1952) - Mark Endicott (1998)
 Plunkett & Macleane (1999) - Lord Pelham
 Harlem Aria (1999) - Matthew
 Story of a Bad Boy (1999) - Noel
 Picture This (1999) - Frank Ryan
 Lip Service (2001) - Stuart
 Double Bang (2001) - Brian Jacobs
 K-19: The Widowmaker (2002) - Pavel
 Presidio Med (2002) - Peter Witowski
 For the People (2002, TV Series) - Paul Babala
 Boomtown (2003) - Bradley Dawson
 Without a Trace (2003) - Freddy Cattan
 CSI: Crime Scene Investigation (2003, TV Series) - Michael Fife
 Karen Sisco (2004) - Arvin Worley
 Welcome to California (2005) - Jimmy Smith
 Ghost Whisperer (2005) - Brad Paulson
 Wanted (2005, TV Series) - Gordon Bianco
 Find Love (2006) - He
 The Picture of Dorian Gray (2007) - Henry Wotton
 The Cry (2007) - Detective Scott
 National Treasure: Book of Secrets (2007) - John Wilkes Booth
 Henry May Long (2008) - Henry May
 Dexter (2006–2007, 2011, TV Series) - Rudy Cooper / Brian Moser
 The Hurt Locker (2008) - Colonel John Cambridge
 Happy Tears (2009) - Jackson
 The Mentalist (2011) - Henry Tibbs
 The Twilight Saga: Breaking Dawn: Part 1 (2011) - Eleazar Denali
 The Twilight Saga: Breaking Dawn: Part 2 (2012) - Eleazar Denali
 Channeling (2003)
 Europa Report (2013) - Daniel Luxembourg
 Haven (2013) - Wade Crocker
 Days and Nights (2014) - Peter
 Romeo and Juliet (2014) - Mercutio
 Elementary (2014, TV Series) - Chris Santos
 House of Cards (2015, TV Series) - Michael Corrigan
 Penny Dreadful (2016, TV Series) - Dr. Alexander Sweet / Dracula
 Wormwood (2017) - Dr. Robert Lashbrook
 The City and the City (2018, TV Series) - Dr. David Bowden
 She's Missing (2019) - Lyle
 See (2019–2022, TV Series) - Tamacti Jun
 Witch Hunt

References

External links

1971 births
Living people
Male actors from New York City
American male film actors
American male stage actors
Hobart and William Smith Colleges alumni
Juilliard School alumni
American male Shakespearean actors
American male actors of Mexican descent
20th-century American male actors
21st-century American male actors
Film directors from New York City
American male screenwriters
Writers from New York City
American male television actors
Television producers from New York City
American television writers
American male television writers
Screenwriters from New York (state)